Andretta is a town and comune in the province of Avellino, Campania, Italy.

Geography
The little town, whose population was greatly reduced by emigration, rises on a high hill in the Apennines dominating the valley of the Ofanto river.

History
The area has traces of settlement from the Bronze Age (1000 BC), as well as Samnite and Roman remains. The earliest historical mention however is in 1124, when it was ruled by the Norman Folleville; other lords were the Zurlo and Caracciolo families.

Twin towns
 Ramapo, United States, since 1996

External links
 Official website

Cities and towns in Campania